Endrick Felipe Moreira de Sousa (born 21 July 2006), known as Endrick Felipe or simply Endrick, is a Brazilian professional footballer who plays as a striker for Campeonato Brasileiro Série A club Palmeiras. He will join La Liga club Real Madrid in July 2024.

Early life
Born in Brasília, Endrick started playing football at the age of four. His father, Douglas Sousa, published his son's goals on YouTube and looked for interested parties among the big Brazilian clubs. Endrick vowed to become a professional footballer to help his family, after his father was unable to feed him. His father was unemployed before receiving a job as a janitor by Palmeiras.

Club career

Palmeiras

Youth career
After nearly signing for São Paulo, he joined Palmeiras youth team at the age of 11. In five years he scored 165 goals in 169 games for Palmeiras youth teams. He participated in the 2022 Copa São Paulo de Futebol Júnior where he scored seven goals in seven games and was voted Player of the Tournament by supporters after leading Palmeiras to their first title. Following the tournament, he caught the attention of international media and major European clubs.

Senior career
Endrick made his professional debut on 6 October 2022, as a second-half substitute in Palmeiras' Série A 4–0 win over Coritiba. At 16 years, two months and 16 days of age, he became the youngest player ever to appear for Palmeiras. He scored his first two goals on 25 October, in a 3–1 win over Athletico Paranaense, becoming the second youngest goal scorer in the history of Brazil's first division, behind Toninho de Matos.

Real Madrid
On 15 December 2022, La Liga club Real Madrid announced that they have reached an agreement with Palmeiras, Endrick, and his family, to sign Endrick when he turns 18 in July 2024.

Style of play
A left-footed forward with a good shot, Endrick has drawn comparisons with legendary Brazil strikers Ronaldo and Romário. When asked to describe his style of play, he said, "I'll always fight. I'll be persistent and try until the last minute I'm in the game. I never give up, I pressure defenders, I run more than anyone else on the pitch."  His idol is Cristiano Ronaldo. He is considered one of Brazil's best football prospects.

Career statistics

Club
.

Honours
Palmeiras Youth
 Copa São Paulo de Futebol Júnior: 2022
 Campeonato Brasileiro Sub-20: 2022
 Copa do Brasil Sub-17: 2022
 : 2021
 : 2021

Palmeiras
Campeonato Brasileiro Série A: 2022
Supercopa do Brasil: 2023

Brazil U16
Montaigu Tournament: 2022

Individual
Campeonato Brasileiro Série A Best Newcomer: 2022
Samba Gold Best Brazilian under-20 player of the year: 2022

References

External links

 Endrick Felipe at playmakerstats.com (English version of ogol.com.br)
 

Living people
2006 births
Sportspeople from Federal District (Brazil)
Footballers from Brasília
Brazilian footballers
Brazil youth international footballers
Association football forwards
Sociedade Esportiva Palmeiras players
Campeonato Brasileiro Série A players